Prostitution in Saudi Arabia is illegal. Prostitution is punishable by prison and flogging. In April 2020, the flogging punishment was abolished by the order of the Saudi Supreme Court General Commission, and is now limited to jail time or fines. Foreign nationals are also deported after punishment. If the parties are also charged with adultery, fornication and sodomy, which can apply to both the prostitute and the client since all sexual activity outside a lawful marriage is illegal, the punishment can be death.

Prostitutes tend to be mostly from Nigeria, Ethiopia, Yemen, Morocco,and Tajikistan.

The Religious Police are responsible for carrying out floggings. Prostitutes may be whipped in public. Some of these have been carried out excessively and deaths have resulted. However, the punishment of flogging was abolished in April 2020, and replaced by fines or jail time. Foreign prostitutes who are arrested by the Saudi vice police face deportation.

In June 2007, 80 women were sent to trial for prostitution and 20 men for trafficking or pimping.

Sex trafficking 
Saudi Arabia is a destination country for  women subjected to forced prostitution.

Saudi Arabia is one of the largest consumers of domestic workers. Around 30% of Saudi's population of 27.3 million are immigrants from other countries. The Law requires that all of the expatriates in Saudi Arabia should have an employment contract while they are in the country. But with some unfair work practices such as sexual harassment, extreme working conditions, and other human rights violations, many try to escape their employers. Runaways are often kidnapped and forced into prostitution. E-commerce sites are being used for buying and selling maids online.

In 2013, the government did not report any prosecutions or convictions of alleged human traffickers. In 2017, although there were 177 trafficking cases prosecuted, none were for sex trafficking.

The United States Department of State Office to Monitor and Combat Trafficking in Persons ranks Saudi Arabia as a 'Tier 2 Watch List' country.

See also
Human trafficking in Saudi Arabia

Notes 

Saudi Arabia
Society of Saudi Arabia
Sexuality in Saudi Arabia
Women's rights in Saudi Arabia
Prostitution in the Middle East
Saudi Arabia